Wicher may refer to:

Wicher-class destroyer
ORP Wicher
ORP Wicher (1958)
ORP Wicher (1928)
PZL.44 Wicher
Maria Wicher
Enos Regnet Wicher, 
De Wicher, Kalenberg, Netherlands
Wicher Berkhoff, Dutch name of Vasily Berkov

See also
Witcher (disambiguation)
Whicher (disambiguation)
Whitcher